Kurt Hornfischer (1 February 1910 in Gera – 18 January 1958 in Nuremberg) was a German wrestler who competed in the 1936 Summer Olympics.

References

1910 births
1958 deaths
Olympic wrestlers of Germany
Wrestlers at the 1936 Summer Olympics
German male sport wrestlers
Olympic bronze medalists for Germany
Olympic medalists in wrestling
Medalists at the 1936 Summer Olympics
Sportspeople from Gera
20th-century German people